Shuffling is a procedure used to randomize a deck of playing cards.

Shuffle or shuffling may also refer to:

Arts, entertainment, and media

Dance
 Shuffle (tap dance), a type of footwork in tap dance
 Chassé, a dance step in several types of dance, is sometimes called a shuffle in line dancing
 Melbourne shuffle, a rave dance originating from Melbourne, Australia
 Shuffle step, a type of footwork in ballroom dance

Music
 Shuffle (album), a 2009 album by Machinefabriek
 "Shuffle" (song), a 2011 song by Bombay Bicycle Club
 "Shuffla", a 2018 song by Swedish duo Samir & Viktor
 Shuffle note, also called swing note; and the shuffle rhythm played with these notes
 Shuffle play, the randomization of a playlist on a music playing device

Other uses
 Shuffle (game show), an interactive game show from 1994
 Shuffle!, a 2004 video game and its corresponding anime
 "Shuffle off this mortal coil", a line from Shakespeare's Hamlet
 Shuffle (dominoes), to mix the tiles in dominoes

Mathematics
 Shuffle algebra, a Hopf algebra with a basis corresponding to words on some set whose product is given by the shuffle product XшY of two words X, Y: the sum of all ways of interlacing them
 Shuffle product, the shuffle product of words of lengths m and n is a sum over the (m+n)!/m!n! ways of interleaving the two words

Other uses
 iPod Shuffle, a portable MP3 player that has no screen and is marketed by Apple Inc.